Emgek-Talaa is a village in the Naryn Region of Kyrgyzstan. It is part of the Naryn District. Its population was 1,866 in 2021.

References
 

 

Populated places in Naryn Region